Daria Gavrilova and Elina Svitolina were the defending champions, but chose not to participate this year.
Andreea Mitu and İpek Soylu won the title by walkover when Xenia Knoll and Danka Kovinić withdrew from the final. Mitu and Soylu won the title by playing only two matches, since their semifinal opponents also withdrew.

Seeds

Draw

References
 Main Draw

2016 in Istanbul
2016 in Turkish tennis
Istanbul Cup - Doubles
İstanbul Cup
İstanbul Cup